Events from the year 1751 in France.

Incumbents 
 Monarch: Louis XV

Events
 28 June – The first volume of Diderot and d'Alembert's Encyclopédie (Encyclopédie, ou dictionnaire raisonné des sciences, des arts et des métiers) is published, notably including a map of their figurative system of human knowledge.
 3 December – Battle of Arnee in India (Second Carnatic War): A British East India Company-led force under Robert Clive defeats and routs a much larger Franco-Indian army under the command of Raza Sahib at Arni.

Births
 1 March – Amand-Marie-Jacques de Chastenet, Marquis of Puységur, mesmerist (d. 1825)

Deaths
 5 February – Henri François d'Aguesseau, Chancellor of France (b. 1668)

See also

References

1750s in France